Lucas Bros. Moving Co. is an American adult animated television series created by The Lucas Brothers. It originally premiered on Fox on November 23, 2013 as part of Animation Domination High-Def, and was renewed for two additional seasons on FXX. The show was cancelled on June 4, 2015.

The series features the twins as work-shy animated counterparts of themselves, running a moving company out of their van. The series is loosely based on the creators' experiences as cable television installers.

Plot

The series revolves around identical twin brothers Kenny and Keef Lucas (voiced by real-life identical twin brothers Kenny and Keith Lucas, respectively), who run a moving company called "Lucas Bros Moving Co" in Greenpoint, Brooklyn, out of their van after receiving it from their dead uncle. The two are shown to frequently consume marijuana, emitting a calm demeanor throughout the various escapades caused at their job. Scrawny and indolent, their customers are often apprehensive towards their weaknesses, but the brothers like to remind themselves "that's why God made two of them."

Production
Lucas Bros. Moving Co. is an animated television series created by twins Kenny and Keith Lucas of "The Lucas Brothers", a Brooklyn-based comedy duo. The series, featuring the voices of the twins as their animated counterparts, originally had them working as installers for a cable company, a job which the Lucas brothers occupied in real life. This idea was scrapped according to Keith, who felt the premise too close to that of The Cleveland Show, another animated series aired by Fox. Kenny insisted that "moving was just more Brooklyn", a sentiment which Keith echoed, thinking that "it would be funny if we were movers because we've never moved a thing in our lives and we're so fucking weak and we hate physical labor". Keith complemented the nature of the premise, finding it to be flexible with any character or setting.

Commenting on the writing process, Keith called it "awesome", citing crew members Nick Weidenfeld, Dave Jeser, and Matt Silverstein as giving them guidance. Kenny urged to "trust the process and not get ahead of yourself", while Keith recommended being patient with breaking scenes down part by part; he also called it similar to their stand-up routines, although the structure of the show made for more comfort.

Commenting on their inspirations, the brothers recognized themselves as animation fans, with Keith mentioning Clone High as one of their favorite series, along with King of the Hill and The Life & Times of Tim. Summing Lucas Bros. as an equation, the two called it "Bill & Ted plus Workaholics plus The Wire (minus the bleakness)." In the United States, the series is rated TV-14. Some jokes have been rejected by the network for content, with the brothers naming a parody of Clay Davis's character from The Wire elongated pronunciation of the word "shit" as an example of this.

Broadcast and reception
The series premiered on November 23, 2013, on Fox, preceding the premiere of Golan the Insatiable; both series were broadcast as part of the network's late-night animation block, Animation Domination High-Def. The duo stated around the time of the premiere that the series was picked up for six additional episodes. Fox announced in April 2014 that the Animation Domination High-Def block would cease broadcast on June 28, 2014, though its programs will continue on digital platforms. In June 2014, the brothers announced a second and third season, following their film debut in 22 Jump Street. These seasons, bringing the total number of episodes to 18, aired on FXX, starting on October 26, 2014 with a sneak peek of the second season premiere.

Mike Hale of The New York Times found the differences between the protagonists and the creators more significant than their similarities. He acknowledged the duo as having "an industriousness completely alien to their fictional counterparts," while calling the protagonists' disinclined nature as perhaps either a "sly" joke about "the travails of young black men trying to earn an honest buck" or the characters' consumption of marijuana. Emily Ashby of Common Sense Media cited the latter point as a probable source of concern among parents having their children watch the series. While she regarded the emptiness of the protagonists' adventures as "surprisingly amusing" in a similar vein to Seinfeld, Ashby ultimately called it "mindless entertainment", stating "there are no subtle themes nor any clever satire to be had here."

Writing for Media Life Magazine, Tom Conroy felt the stoner comedy played to the series' strengths—a rarity, he felt, among comedians relying on such humor while under the influence themselves. While he dubbed the twins' humor "as lazy and aimless" as their animated counterparts at times, he concluded that "its genial vibe makes it a pleasant way to burn off a quarter hour." Reviewing both the series and Golan the Insatiable, Erik Adams of The A.V. Club felt  the "horizons" of Lucas Bros. were broader than that of Golan, given that its "slacker vibe so readily goes with the surreal flow." Adams stated the show resembled Adventure Time if the aforementioned series' creative staff were allowed to joke about marijuana, but concluded that the series' humor invoked no more than "a moony grin".

Episodes

Season 1 (2013–14)

Season 2 (2014–2015)

Explanatory notes

References

Further reading

External links
 

2010s American adult animated television series
2010s American animated comedy television series
2010s American black cartoons
2010s American black sitcoms
2010s American workplace comedy television series
2010s American surreal comedy television series
2013 American television series debuts
2015 American television series endings
American adult animated comedy television series
American animated sitcoms
American flash adult animated television series
English-language television shows
Fox Broadcasting Company original programming
FXX original programming
Television series by 20th Century Fox Television
Television series by Fox Television Animation
Animated television series about brothers
Animated television series about twins